The House of Sport Lisboa e Benfica in Macau, simply known as Benfica de Macau, is a Macanese professional football team that currently competes in the Liga de Elite. They are the five-time champions of the league.

The club plays its home games at the Macau Olympic Complex Stadium.

History
Benfica de Macau was founded on 17 October 1951, as the House No. 232 of S.L. Benfica.

On 21 August 2016, Benfica de Macau defeated Rovers FC of Guam 4–2 in a 2017 AFC Cup Play-off Qualifier in Bishkek. It was the first win ever for a Macanese club in any AFC competition.

In 2018, Benfica de Macau became the first Macanese club to participate in the AFC Cup group stage. On 7 March 2018, Benfica won 3–2 against Taiwan's Hang Yuen, becoming the first Macanese club to win an AFC group stage match.

Continental history

Current squad
Squad for the 2021 Liga de Elite

Honours

League
Liga de Elite 
 Champions (5): 2014, 2015, 2016, 2017, 2018

Cup Competitions
Taça de Macau
 Champions (3): 2013, 2014, 2017
 Runners-up: 2015

References

External links

 Website: www.benficamacau.com
 benfica.macau on Instagram

Football clubs in Macau
Association football clubs established in 1951
Macau
1951 establishments in Macau